The 2014 Australian Grand Prix (formally known as the 2014 Formula 1 Rolex Australian Grand Prix) was a Formula One motor race that was held on 16 March 2014 in Melbourne. The race was contested over 58 laps of the Melbourne Grand Prix Circuit and was the first round of the 2014 FIA Formula One World Championship. It marked the debut of new Formula One regulations which introduced 1.6-litre turbocharged V6 engines to the sport, the first time since the 1988 Australian Grand Prix that turbocharged engines have been used in Formula One. It was the 79th race in the combined history of the Australian Grand Prix – which dates back to the 100 Miles Road Race of 1928 – and the 19th time the event was held at the Melbourne Grand Prix Circuit. The race also marked the thirtieth year that the Australian Grand Prix was run as a round of the Formula One World Championship.

The race was won by German driver Nico Rosberg in a Mercedes F1 W05. It was Rosberg's fourth Grand Prix victory and completed a rare double in the Australian Grand Prix, winning a race his father Keke had won in Adelaide in 1985, the first time Australia hosted a World Championship race. This feat had previously been achieved by Stan and Alan Jones and Graham and Damon Hill. Rosberg had earlier achieved the same feat in the Monaco Grand Prix as well. Kevin Magnussen finished second in a McLaren MP4-29 on his Formula One debut, the first podium finish in a World Championship Grand Prix by a Danish driver and Magnussen's only podium. Third was Jenson Button in the second McLaren, who recorded his 50th and final Formula One podium with the result (although he did not take part in the podium ceremony as the stewards had yet to disqualify Daniel Ricciardo). Daniil Kvyat, aged 19, was classified in ninth, becoming the youngest points-scorer in Formula One. Australian driver Daniel Ricciardo originally finished in second place for Red Bull Racing, but was later disqualified due to illegal fuel flow throughout the race.

The race marked the end of Sebastian Vettel's streak of nine race wins in a row. Magnussen and Button's podium finishes were the last for McLaren until the 2019 Brazilian Grand Prix.

Report

Background
Tyre supplier Pirelli brought its white-banded medium compound tyre as the harder "prime" tyre and the yellow-banded soft compound tyre as the softer "option" tyre, as opposed to the previous year where medium and super-soft selections were provided.

Qualifying
Daniel Ricciardo set the early pace in his debut for Red Bull Racing, while Lotus struggled, with Pastor Maldonado failing to set a time and Romain Grosjean qualifying 21st, which became 20th when Esteban Gutiérrez was given a penalty for a gearbox change in his Sauber. Max Chilton out-qualified his Marussia teammate Jules Bianchi, but missed out on a place in Q2 by one hundredth of a second. Caterham driver Marcus Ericsson was the final driver eliminated in Q1, with his teammate Kamui Kobayashi overcoming a lack of running in Free Practice to advance to the next period.

Rain began to fall in Q2, with the slippery conditions claiming their first victim in Kimi Räikkönen, who spun his Ferrari late in the period. Räikkönen's accident interrupted the laps of several drivers, with Jenson Button and reigning World Champion Sebastian Vettel both reporting that Räikkönen's accident prevented them from advancing to Q3. It was later found that Vettel was also hindered by engine problems, which had plagued him since FP3 that morning. Sauber's Adrian Sutil finished the period in fourteenth, with Kamui Kobayashi fifteenth after Sergio Pérez spun his Force India on his final flying lap.

The rain intensified in the final period, with several drivers venturing out on full wet tyres. Mercedes drivers Lewis Hamilton and Nico Rosberg, and Ricciardo, started a three-way battle for pole that came down to their final laps. Hamilton prevailed, with Ricciardo qualifying a career-best second in his home race. Rosberg started from third, alongside Kevin Magnussen, who qualified his McLaren fourth in his Formula One debut. After Räikkönen's Q2 accident had left him twelfth, Fernando Alonso gave Ferrari a decent result when he recovered to fifth after making the wrong tyre choice early in the period and started next to the Toro Rosso of Jean-Éric Vergne. Force India's Nico Hülkenberg and debutant Daniil Kvyat filled the next row of the grid, ahead of the Williams pair of Felipe Massa and Valtteri Bottas, who, like Gutiérrez, was demoted five places for a gearbox change.

Post-qualifying
Kevin Magnussen and Sebastian Vettel were referred to the stewards for speeding under yellow flags following Kimi Räikkönen's accident, but they were cleared of any wrongdoing. Fernando Alonso was called to the stewards for impeding Esteban Gutiérrez in Q1, but also escaped a penalty. Pastor Maldonado failed to post a lap time during qualifying. He was allowed to start the race on the stewards' discretion, who judged that he was capable of lapping within the 107% limit based on his free practice times.

Race

The race began at 17:00 local time. Marussia drivers Max Chilton and Jules Bianchi stalled on the grid, with Bianchi having a problem after the formation lap and Chilton stalling at the beginning of the formation lap. Romain Grosjean started the race from the pit lane due to car modifications under parc fermé conditions and received a drive-through penalty for leaving the garage before the 15-minute signal. Seconds after the lights had gone out, Felipe Massa, Kamui Kobayashi and Kimi Räikkönen were involved in a first-lap collision, putting Kobayashi and Massa out of the race whilst Räikkönen's Ferrari did not suffer any major damage and was able to continue the race without further problems. It was later confirmed Kobayashi had suffered a loss of rear brakes.

Polesitter Lewis Hamilton's engine lost a cylinder at the start of the race, which resulted in him dropping to third by the first corner. Nico Rosberg got a good start, allowing him to pass Daniel Ricciardo in addition to his teammate, and at the first corner Rosberg led, with Ricciardo second and Hamilton third. Hamilton continued to slip down the order with his engine running on five cylinders - having fallen from first to fifth by the end of lap one - and on the second lap he was called into the pits to retire. Defending world champion Sebastian Vettel also had an early retirement due to engine issues, retiring on lap three. Rosberg dominantly won the race by almost twenty-five seconds, picking up his fourth career win, and his first since the previous year's British Grand Prix. Daniel Ricciardo snatched second in front of his home crowd, making him the first Australian Formula One driver to finish on the podium in his home race as a world championship round. John Smith finished on the podium in 1983, but at the time, it was not yet an official Formula One world championship round. Kevin Magnussen finished third, two seconds behind Ricciardo. This made him the first Formula One debutant since Lewis Hamilton at the 2007 Australian Grand Prix seven years earlier to finish on the podium.

Magnussen's teammate Jenson Button took fourth after starting eleventh, finishing just over 3 seconds behind his teammate and half a minute behind Rosberg. He was followed by Fernando Alonso in fifth. Valtteri Bottas finished in sixth despite clipping the wall and causing a puncture on the right rear tire on lap 11. Nico Hülkenberg finished seventh, 2013 winner Kimi Räikkönen eighth, Jean-Éric Vergne in ninth and debutant Daniil Kvyat in tenth, becoming the youngest points-scorer in Formula One. The Ferraris suffered some electrical problems in the race, according to the team.

Post race
Daniel Ricciardo was disqualified from the race for a breach of Article 5.1.4 of the Formula One Technical Regulations, which govern the maximum allowable rate at which fuel may flow into the engine. The team were also referred to the stewards for using an unauthorised method of measuring the fuel flow. Kevin Magnussen was thus promoted to second with Jenson Button up to third. It was Button's 50th and final podium finish, but the podium ceremony took place before Ricciardo's exclusion which meant Button did not take part in the proceedings.

Red Bull immediately announced their intention to appeal the disqualification, claiming that the sensors provided by the FIA to measure the fuel flow were unreliable. The appeal was heard by the FIA on 14 April, but it was rejected and the disqualification was upheld. This meant that McLaren got their first double podium since the 2012 Chinese Grand Prix.

Kamui Kobayashi was referred to the stewards as well for his involvement in the first-lap collision with Felipe Massa and Kimi Räikkönen. The stewards decided not to take any further action against him after they determined that the accident was triggered by a mechanical failure on his Caterham.

Classification

Qualifying

Notes:
  — Valtteri Bottas and Esteban Gutiérrez were given a five-place grid penalty for changing their gearboxes.
  — Driver started the race from pit lane.
  — Pastor Maldonado failed to set a lap time within 107% of the fastest lap time set by Daniel Ricciardo in Q1. He was later given permission to start by race stewards.

Race

Notes:
  — Jules Bianchi did not complete 90% of the race distance, and therefore is not classified as a finisher in the official results.
  — Daniel Ricciardo was disqualified for breaching the maximum fuel limit and using an unauthorised method of measuring fuel consumption.

Championship standings after the race

Drivers' Championship standings

Constructors' Championship standings

 Note: Only the top five positions are included for both sets of standings.

References

External links

Australian
Australian Grand Prix
Grand Prix
Australian Grand Prix